Rizza Jane Mandapat (born February 28, 1994) is a Filipino volleyball player. She currently plays for the Creamline Cool Smashers in the Premier Volleyball League.

Clubs
  Shopinas.com Lady Clickers (2015)
  Bureau of Customs Transformers (2015) 
  Cignal HD Spikers (2016)
  Creamline Cool Smashers (2017-present)

Awards

Collegiate

Clubs

References

Filipino women's volleyball players
Opposite hitters
1994 births
Living people